The Government Degree College, Ganderbal (commonly referred to as Degree College Ganderbal) is a Government education College in Ganderbal district located at the right bank of Nallah Sindh in the union territory of Jammu and Kashmir of India. The college is affiliated to the University of Kashmir.

Establishment 
The Government of Jammu and Kashmir established this Institute in the year 2003 and started its working in the same year. The institution was established along with other institutions sanctioned for newly carved districts in 2002, with a view to offer higher education at the district levels in various disciplines of Arts and
Commerse studies for the rural areas.

Courses
Bachelor of Commerce 
Bachelor of Computer Applications
Bachelor of Arts
Bachelor of science

References

 http://gdcganderbal.edu.in

External links
 College website

Universities and colleges in Jammu and Kashmir
University of Kashmir
Degree colleges in Kashmir Division
2003 establishments in Jammu and Kashmir
Educational institutions established in 2003
Colleges affiliated to University of Kashmir